Bongwater may refer to:
Bongwater (novel), a 1995 novel by Michael Hornburg
 Bongwater (film), a 1998 comedy film adapted from the Hornburg novel
 Bongwater (band), a 1985-92 rock band
 Bong water, the used fluid from a bong